Acacia crassiuscula is a shrub belonging to the genus Acacia and the subgenus Phyllodineae found along the south coast of Western Australia.

Description
The erect and spindly shrub typically grows to a height of  an has glabrous branchlets. The dark green phyllodes are ascending to erect and have a linear shape that can be shallowly incurved. It blooms from July to October and produces cream-yellow flowers.

Taxonomy
The species was first formally described by the botanist Heinrich Wendland in 1820 as part of the work Commentatio de Acaciis aphyllis, it was reclassified as Racosperma crassiusculum in 2003 by Leslie Pedley then reverted to the genus Acacia in 2006. Several synonyms for this species are known including Acacia pycnophylla and Acacia sieberi.

A. crassiuscula resembles Acacia cupularis and Acacia harveyi. The phyllodes have the same shape and size as those of Acacia euthyphylla.

Distribution
It is native to an area along the south coast in the Goldfields-Esperance, Great Southern and South West regions of Western Australia where it commonly occurs among granite outcrops and hills and on sandplains where it grows in sandy or rocky soils usually over granite or quartzite. The bulk of the population is found between Albany and Cape Arid National Park with other scattered outlying populations. It is often part of mallee scrub and heath communities.

See also
List of Acacia species

References

crassiuscula
Acacias of Western Australia
Plants described in 1820
Taxa named by Johann Christoph Wendland